A general election was held in the Northern Territory, Australia, on 18 August 2001. The centre-left Labor Party (ALP), led by Clare Martin, won a surprising victory over the Country Liberal Party (CLP).  Before this, the CLP had held 18 out the 25 seats in the Northern Territory Legislative Assembly to the ALP's 7.  After this election, the ALP held the majority with 13 seats to the CLP's 10, consigning the CLP to opposition for the first time since the Territory gained responsible government.  Martin became Chief Minister, succeeding the CLP's Denis Burke.

While the CLP won a bare majority of the two-party vote, Labor picked up an unexpectedly large swing in the Darwin area.  Labor took all but one seat in the capital, including all seven seats in the northern part of the city.  Darwin's northern suburbs are somewhat more diverse than the rest of the city, and were on paper friendlier to Labor than the rest of the capital.  In the process, Labor unseated four sitting MLAs.  The result was not known for several days, in part due to a very close race in Millner between CLP incumbent Phil Mitchell and Labor challenger Matthew Bonson.  Ultimately, Bonson won by a margin of 82 votes, allowing Labor to win government by one seat.

Two independents won seats at this election. Former CLP member Loraine Braham won the seat of Braitling and Gerry Wood won the seat of Nelson.

Retiring MPs

ALP
Maggie Hickey MLA (Barkly)
Maurice Rioli MLA (Arafura)

CLP
Stephen Hatton MLA (Nightcliff)
Daryl Manzie MLA (Sanderson)
Terry McCarthy MLA (Goyder)
Eric Poole MLA (Araluen)

Results

|}

Candidates

Sitting members are listed in bold. Successful candidates are highlighted in the relevant colour.

Seats changing hands 

 Members listed in italics did not contest their seats at this election.
 *Braitling's second figure is CLP vs. Independent.
 **Due to boundary changes, Macdonnell was notionally ALP at the time of this election.
 ***Due to boundary changes, Wanguri were notionally CLP at the time of this election.

Electoral pendulum
The following pendulum is known as the Mackerras pendulum, invented by psephologist Malcolm Mackerras.  The pendulum works by lining up all of the seats held in the Legislative Assembly according to the percentage point margin they are held by on a two-party-preferred basis. This is also known as the swing required for the seat to change hands. Given a uniform swing to the opposition or government parties, the number of seats that change hands can be predicted.

Pre-election pendulum
Incumbent members who have become and remained an independent since the 1997 election are indicated in grey.

Members listed in italics did not re-contest their seat at the election.

Post-election pendulum

External links
Northern Territory Election 2001 Department of the Parliamentary Library

References 

Elections in the Northern Territory
2001 elections in Australia
2000s in the Northern Territory
August 2001 events in Australia